XTRMST was an American straight edge hardcore punk band featuring Davey Havok and Jade Puget of AFI. XTRMST was Havok and Puget's second side project together, after their electronic project Blaqk Audio. They released their debut album XTRMST in 2014 on long-time friend Steve Aoki's Dim Mak Records. Havok and Puget later added Chris Sorenson (Saosin) on bass, Josh James (Stick to Your Guns, Evergreen Terrace, Casey Jones) on guitar, and Val Saucedo (Loma Prieta, Punch) on drums.

The band ultimately played two live shows in early 2015: One at the Roxy in West Hollywood, and one at The Observatory in Santa Ana. The project became inactive in 2015 and has not been revisited since, with each member returning to their main bands.

Band members 

 Davey Havok – lead vocals 
 Jade Puget – lead guitar 
 Josh James – rhythm guitar 
 Chris Sorenson – bass 
 Val Saucedo – drums

Discography

Albums

Studio albums

Extended plays

Singles

Non-album tracks

Music videos

References

Further reading
 Punknews
 Loudwire
 Loudwire
 Loudwire
 Loudwire
 Blabbermouth

External links 
 

2014 establishments in California
Hardcore punk groups from California
Musical groups established in 2014
Musical quintets
Straight edge groups